Porpidia flavicunda is a species of crustose lichen in the family Lecideaceae.

Taxonomy
The species was described in 1810 by Erik Acharius as Lecidea flavicunda. Since then it has been reclassified a number of times, even at genus level, having, at one time or another, been placed in the genera Lecidea, Huilia, Biatora, Haplocarpon, Lichen and its current genus, Porpidia.

The species taxonomy was last revised in 1989, when it obtained its current species name, Porpidia flavicunda.

Distribution and ecology
Porpidia flavicunda has a circumpolar arctic and boreal distribution. There are indications P. flavicunda populations frequently spread their propagules to other populations, even on different continents, resulting in low amounts of genetic drift in isolated populations and a higher than expected genetic uniformity between continents.

Porpidia flavicunda is among the most common and widely seen lichens in Iceland where it grows on rocks.

References

Lecideales
Lichen species
Lichens described in 1989
Fungi of North America
Taxa named by Erik Acharius